Unkle (often stylised as U.N.K.L.E. or UNKLE, occasionally known as UNKLE Sounds) is a British musical outfit founded in 1992 by James Lavelle. Originally categorised as trip hop, the group once included producer DJ Shadow and have employed a variety of guest artists and producers.

History

First incarnation (1992–1996)
The first release credited to the 'Men from U.N.K.L.E' was a remix for United Future Organization, included on their 1992 Loud Minority single. Lavelle and Goldsworthy were joined by Masayuki Kudo and Toshio Nakanishi of the Japanese hip hop crew Major Force (later Major Force West).

Second incarnation (1997–1999)
Lavelle drafted in DJ Shadow to work on the debut album, and essentially discarded all previously recorded material. Lavelle and Shadow released Psyence Fiction in 1998 to a mixed critical response. The album included collaborations with an all-star lineup including Thom Yorke (Radiohead), Mark Hollis (Talk Talk), Mike D (Beastie Boys), Kool G Rap, Jason Newsted (Metallica), Badly Drawn Boy and Richard Ashcroft (The Verve). The album was mixed by Shadow's long-time collaborator, producer Jim Abbiss.

Shadow left the group after touring Psyence Fiction and was replaced by turntablist group the Scratch Perverts, who deconstructed the album and performed it live on turntables in 1999. Also in 1999, former producer Rich File remixed the track "Unreal", adding vocals by Ian Brown, and the resulting track was released as the single "Be There".

On 1 February 1999, Lavelle and the Scratch Perverts appeared on the Radio 1 program The Breezeblock, utilising "5 turntables". The set was largely based on tracks from Psyence Fiction, with some of them reworked live by Lavelle for the live performance. The Scratch Perverts' contribution consisted of scratching over the top of the Unkle tracks, a deconstructed version of "Be There", and some solo interludes.

Third incarnation (2000–2007)
In 2001, Lavelle and File resurfaced as Unklesounds, with a DJ mix created for Japanese radio entitled Do Androids Dream of Electric Beats?  This highlighted a new, more electronic direction the group had taken, and featured a number of tracks from Psyence Fiction, remixed in a techy breakbeat style.

Rich File co-produced, played and sang on the second album, Never, Never, Land, released in 2003. The album again featured a number of high-profile contributors, including Ian Brown, Josh Homme (Queens of the Stone Age), Robert Del Naja (Massive Attack) and Mani (The Stone Roses, Primal Scream) among others.

Lavelle and File continued releasing mixes as Unklesounds. The mix album Edit Music for a Film: Original Motion Picture Soundtrack Reconstruction, featuring movie samples and tracks from film soundtracks, was created for the After Dark 2004 event at the ICA London. A single CD version was handed out at the event, and it was released officially as an extended two disc set in 2005. The group recorded music for a short film titled The Seed directed by Joe Hahn alongside John Debney and Mike Shinoda of Linkin Park.

In September 2006, Global Underground released Self Defence: Never, Never, Land Reconstructed and Bonus Beats, a 4-CD box set of remixes and bonus tracks from the Never, Never, Land sessions, including tracks previously only available on the original DVD release of the album. It also contained remixes of a track mooted for their next album, featuring Ian Astbury of The Cult, titled "Burn My Shadow".

War Stories, the third album from Unkle, was released in summer 2007. The album again featured a number of guests including Josh Homme, Gavin Clark, Robert Del Naja, Ian Astbury, The Duke Spirit, Autolux and Neil Davidge. Following the release of the single "Hold My Hand", Pablo Clements (of The Psychonauts) became an Unkle member.

Fourth incarnation (2008–present)
In January 2008 Unkle released More Stories, containing a mix of B-sides, remixes, unreleased War Stories session tracks, and music composed for the film Odyssey in Rome. The same month, Rich File announced he was leaving Unkle after 10 years' collaboration to pursue work with his new band, We Fell to Earth. 
In March the Lazarides Gallery in London showcased War Paint, an exhibition of artworks inspired by the recent Unkle album War Stories, with works from Robert Del Naja, Warren du Preez, Nick Thornton Jones, Will Bankhead and Ben Drury.
Unkle began touring the UK with Zoot Woman and Sebastian and Mr. Flash from the French electro record label Ed Banger Records. The concert, set across four acts, featured live performances from past Unkle contributors including Badly Drawn Boy, Liela Moss from The Duke Spirit, Gavin Clark and Joel Cadbury from South.

Unkle's fourth full album titled End Titles... Stories for Film was released in July 2008. It includes collaborations with Chris Goss, Black Mountain, Philip Sheppard, Dave Bateman, Joel Cadbury, and James Griffith (Lake Trout). The album is described in the sleeve notes by Lavelle as "not a new album in the usual sense, but new music that has been inspired by the moving image." As such, it can be considered a companion piece both to War Stories but also to the earlier Unklesounds mix, Edit Music for a Film.

14 December 2008 saw the digital release of End Titles... Redux, an album that was released the following day in a limited pressing of 3000 CDs available from official Unkle stores. This release features seven re-interpreted tracks from the album End Titles... Stories for Film plus 2 never-before-released tracks, "When Once It Was" and "A Perfect Storm". The exclusive package is a 6-panel soft-pack with a 12-page booklet with images by Robert Del Naja.

Upon the release of the single "Heavy Drug (Surrender Sounds Mix)" in August 2009, Unkle disclosed they had already begun recording their next studio album, Where Did the Night Fall, which was released in May 2010. This also included an all-star cast of performers including: Mark Lanegan, Nick Cave, The Black Angels, Sleepy Sun, and Katrina Ford, as well as ELLE J and Gavin Clark. The album is also available as a digital download from Unkle's site.

It was announced on 18 April 2011 that Unkle would headline the Dance Stage at the Reading and Leeds Festivals. They would be performing a world-exclusive audio-visual DJ set at the festivals, playing songs from their back catalogue alongside remixes of other artists' songs as well as Unkle's own material. They would be performing under the name Unkle Sounds.

On 27 February 2014, the "God of Light (Original Game Soundtrack)" single was published on iTunes, with two songs from the God of Light game by Playmous and EON. The in-game credits list "Music composed by: UNKLE / James Lavelle / Charlie May."

On 15 July 2016 Unkle released the single "Cowboys or Indians", which featured artists Ysée, Mink, and Elliott Power. Pitchfork reported Unkle would release an album that same year. In January 2017, Unkle announced the pending release of the album The Road, which will be preceded by the single "Sick Lullaby" to be released in mid February 2017. It coincides with an exhibition at the Lazarides gallery in London.

Unkle collaborated with Michael Kiwanuka for the track "On My Knees" for a companion album to the 2018 Netflix film Roma and a new mix of this track later appeared on the 2021 album Rōnin I.

Members

Current members
 James Lavelle - production, instruments (1992–present)
 Jack Leonard - vocals, guitar, production (2016-present)
 Matthew Puffett (Future Beat Alliance) - keyboards (2016-present)

Former members
 DJ Shadow - production, turntables (1997–1999)
 Toshio Nakanishi - production (1992–1996)
 K.U.D.O  - production (1992–1996)
 Tim Goldsworthy  - production (1992–1996)
 Rich File - vocals, guitar, production (1999-2008)  
 Pablo Clements  - production, instruments (2003-2011)

Current touring members
 Liela Moss (The Duke Spirit) - vocals, keyboards (2016-present)
 Steve Weston - engineering, visuals
 Alex Thomas (Squarepusher, Air) - drums

Former touring members
 Bob Knight (Kylie Minogue) - drums (2003-2004)
 Antony Genn (Pulp, The Hours) - bass (2003-2004)
 Rich Fownes - guitar (2007-2008)
 James Griffith - bass, guitar, vocals (2007-2014)
 Mike Lowry - drums (2007-2014)
 Matt Pierce - keyboards (2007-2014)
 The Scratch Perverts - turntables, visuals (1999)

Discography

Psyence Fiction (1998)
Never, Never, Land (2003)
War Stories (2007)
Where Did the Night Fall (2010)
The Road: Part I (2017)

Appearances

Tours
2008 Unkle Live – UK Tour Stories
2008 Creamfields Buenos Aires, Argentina.

References

External links
https://unkle.com/ Official Website

DJ Shadow
English electronic music groups
English rock music groups
Musical groups from London
Trip hop groups
Musical groups established in 1992
1992 establishments in England